The Federal Ministry of Information and Culture is a Nigerian ministry whose function is to provide Nigerian citizens with "credible and timely information on government activities, programmes and initiatives" and to create the technological environment for Nigeria's socio-economic development.

The ministry is headed by a minister who is appointed by the President of Nigeria. The current minister is Lai Mohammed.

External links
Nigerian Federal Ministry of Information and Culture

References

Federal Ministries of Nigeria